The Samuel Cupples House is a historic mansion in St. Louis, Missouri, constructed from 1888 to 1890 by Samuel Cupples. It is now a museum on the campus of Saint Louis University. It was listed on the National Register of Historic Places in 1976.

History
Originally designed by Thomas B. Annan in the Romanesque Revival architectural style, construction of the house and stables began in 1888, before being completed in 1890 at an expense of $15 million in 2020 dollars.  Originally, the home was the residence of wealthy St. Louis entrepreneur Samuel Cupples.  In 1946, the house was bought by Saint Louis University for $50,000 USD and converted to serve as a student center (complete with a bowling alley and bar in the basement) and an office for academic advising.

In 1973, Maurice McNamee, S.J. was tasked with restoring the mansion to its original appearance. Since its restoration, the House has been converted into a museum.

Exhibits
Today, the Eleanor Turshin Glass Collection is shown throughout the house as a permanent exhibit showcasing Art Nouveau and Art Deco glassware. The basement of the building houses the McNamee Gallery, which hosts art exhibitions of SLU students and faculty, as well as visiting artists.

References

External links

Official website (Saint Louis University)

Houses in St. Louis
Saint Louis University
Museums in St. Louis
Historic house museums in Missouri
University museums in Missouri
Landmarks of St. Louis
Richardsonian Romanesque architecture in Missouri
Art museums and galleries in Missouri
Decorative arts museums in the United States
Midtown St. Louis
Houses on the National Register of Historic Places in Missouri
National Register of Historic Places in St. Louis
1976 establishments in Missouri
Tourist attractions in St. Louis
Buildings and structures in St. Louis
Gilded Age mansions